Tingena crotala is a species of moth in the family Oecophoridae. It is endemic to New Zealand and is found both in the North and South Islands. This species inhabits native forest and is on the wing in November and December.

Taxonomy 
This species was first described by Edward Meyrick in 1915 and named Borkhausenia crotala. Meyrick was proposing the species name B. crotala for his conception of Walker's Oecophora contextella.  George Hudson discussed and illustrated this species under the name Borkhausenia plagiatella in his 1928 publication The butterflies and moths of New Zealand, having synonymised B. crotala in that publication. Alfred Philpott also discussed this species under the name B. plagiatella. In that publication Philpott recommended that the two forms encapsulated by the concepts B. crotala and B. plagiatella be separated on the basis of the differences in the male genitalia. In 1988 J. S. Dugdale resurrected the species originally described by Meyrick in 1915 and placed it within the genus Tingena. The male lectotype, collected in Dunedin, is held in the Natural History Museum, London.

Description 

This species is variable in appearance. T. crotala has a white scaled head. Meyrick described his conception of Walker's B. contextella, later to be named B. crotala, as follows:

Distribution 
T. crotala is endemic to New Zealand and has been observed in Auckland, Waimarino, Christchurch, Dunedin, Invercargill, Lake Wakatipu.

Behaviour 
Adults are on the wing in November and December.

Habitat
This species has been collected in native forest but is also said to have an affinity with Cupressus macrocarpa. The larvae of this species feeds on leaf litter.

References

Oecophoridae
Moths of New Zealand
Moths described in 1915
Endemic fauna of New Zealand
Taxa named by Edward Meyrick
Endemic moths of New Zealand